Aroga aristotelis is a moth of the family Gelechiidae. It is found in France, Spain, Italy, Ukraine, Romania, Bulgaria and Greece, as well as on Crete, Sicily and the Canary Islands. It has also been recorded from Turkey, Israel, the Ural Mountains, Iran and Turkmenistan.

The larvae feed on Astragalus echinus. They mine the leaves of their host plant. The larvae live in a silken tube covered with sand. This tube runs from the ground to the lower leaves of the host, where larval feeding causes fleck mines. Pupation takes place outside of the mine. The larvae reach a length of 17–18 mm. They a pale greyish green body with white lines and a black brown head. The larvae can be found from May to June.

References

Moths described in 1876
Aroga
Moths of Europe
Moths of Asia